The 2008 Tennessee Titans season was the team's 49th season and 39th in the National Football League, their 12th in Tennessee, and their tenth as the Titans.

Despite making the playoffs in the 2007 season with a record of 10–6, the Titans were expected by most sportswriters to finish third or even fourth in the AFC South. They nonetheless compiled a 13–3 regular season record—the best in the NFL—and won home-field advantage for the duration of the playoffs after clinching AFC South on December 7 after a win over the Cleveland Browns and a 10–0 start. However, the Titans lost two of their last three regular season games, and were eliminated by the Baltimore Ravens in the divisional round.

This was the last season the Tennessee Titans qualified for the playoffs until 2017, and also the last season when the Titans won the AFC South until 2020, when they also lost to the Ravens in their first playoff game. It would be the final season the Titans gained the AFC's top seed for 13 years.

2008 NFL Draft

Roster

Schedule

Pre-season

Regular season

Note: Division opponents are in bold text.

Standings

Regular season results

Week 1: vs. Jacksonville Jaguars

The Titans pulled off an important divisional win behind the strong running of rookie RB Chris Johnson, who rushed for 93 yards in his NFL debut, and the arm of backup quarterback Kerry Collins, who replaced starter Vince Young when he went down late in the 4th quarter. Young had been inconsistent, throwing 1 TD pass to Johnson and 2 INTs. However, Collins moved the ball down field effectively and that drive led to the eventual game-winning touchdown run by LenDale White. Jacksonville trailed for much of the game and couldn't run the ball against a locked in Titans defense, who sacked Jaguars quarterback David Garrard seven times. Both teams' defenses played well but the Titans held on. This game was also significant because the Jaguars, Texans, and Colts (in their debut at Lucas Oil Stadium) lost, so the Titans grabbed first place in the AFC South for the first week of the season, ending a 56-week streak of holding 1st place in the division by the Colts as the team started the season 1–0.

Week 2: at Cincinnati Bengals

The Titans stayed in 1st place thanks to the extremely strong wind from the remnants of Hurricane Ike (which interfered with an important field goal attempt by Shayne Graham) and a sloppy Cincinnati offense in a 24–7 rout. Chris Johnson ran for over 100 yards for the first time in his career and Kerry Collins had a good day filling in for the injured Vince Young. The Titans first scored on a 1-yd TD run by LenDale White after a scoreless 1st quarter and then Cincinnati scored its only touchdown with a Chris Perry 13-yd TD run on 4th down. The Titans, with a little over a minute left, drove the ball downfield and took a 14–7 lead at the half thanks to an 11-yd touchdown reception by Justin Gage. The knockout punch was delivered early in the 4th quarter with the Titans leading 17–7. Keith Bulluck recovered a blocked punt in the endzone to finish off the Bengals and keep the Titans perfect.

The win also gave the Titans a 2–0 start for the first time since 1999.

Week 3: vs. Houston Texans

Coming off their road win over the Bengals, the Titans went home for a Week 3 duel with the Houston Texans. In the first quarter, Tennessee trailed early as Houston Texans kicker Kris Brown got a 44-yard field goal. The Titans responded with RB LenDale White getting a 2-yard TD run. Houston drew close as Brown kicked a 24-yard field goal, yet Tennessee answered with QB Kerry Collins completing a 9-yard TD pass to TE Bo Scaife. The Texans replied with RB Steve Slaton getting a 6-yard TD run (with a failed PAT), while the Titans closed out the half with White's 1-yard TD run. In the third quarter, Tennessee increased its lead with kicker Rob Bironas nailing a 44-yard field goal. In the fourth quarter, the Titans closed out the game with CB Cortland Finnegan returning an interception 99 yards for a touchdown.

With the win, Tennessee acquired its first 3–0 start since their Super Bowl run of 1999.

Week 4: vs. Minnesota Vikings

Coming off their home win over the Texans, the Titans stayed at home for a Week 4 interconference duel with the Minnesota Vikings. In the first quarter, Tennessee drew first blood as kicker Rob Bironas got a 20-yard field goal, along with rookie RB Chris Johnson getting a 1-yard TD run. In the second quarter, the Vikings responded with RB Adrian Peterson getting a 28-yard TD run. Afterwards, the Titans answered with Bironas kicking a 32-yard field goal, along with RB LenDale White getting a 1-yard TD run. Minnesota closed out the half with kicker Ryan Longwell getting a 42-yard field goal.

In the third quarter, Tennessee increased its lead with Bironas nailing a 49-yard field goal. In the fourth quarter, the Vikings tried to rally as Peterson got a 3-yard TD run, yet the Titans pulled away with Johnson getting a 6-yard TD run. The end of the game came with a bad call by the coach, as he elected to punt on 4th down, despite being after the two minute warning, down by two scores and out of time outs. After the Vikings caught a fair catch, they proceeded to take three kneel downs to run out the game clock.

With the win, Tennessee acquired its first 4–0 start in franchise history.

Week 5: at Baltimore Ravens

Coming off their home win over the Vikings, the Titans flew to M&T Bank Stadium for a Week 5 defensive duel with the Baltimore Ravens. In the first quarter, Tennessee trailed early as Ravens kicker Matt Stover got a 38-yard field goal. In the second quarter, the Titans tied the game with kicker Rob Bironas getting a 35-yard field goal. In the third quarter, Baltimore took the lead as RB Le'Ron McClain got a 1-yard TD run. Fortunately, in the fourth quarter, Tennessee rallied with Bironas nailing a 26-yard field goal, along with QB Kerry Collins completing an 11-yard TD pass to TE Alge Crumpler.

With the win, the Titans kept their perfect season alive as they entered their bye week at 5–0. During this bye week, the Titans became the only undefeated team in the NFL with the Giants' loss to the Browns in Week 6.

Week 7: at Kansas City Chiefs

Coming off their bye week, the Titans flew to Arrowhead Stadium for a Week 7 duel with the Kansas City Chiefs. In the first quarter, Tennessee drew first blood as kicker Rob Bironas got a 49-yard field goal, along with RB LenDale White getting a 6-yard TD run. In the second quarter, the Titans increased their lead as White got a 2-yard TD run. In the third quarter, Tennessee continued its victory march as Bironas got a 46-yard field goal. In the fourth quarter, the Titans ripped it up as White got an 80-yard TD run. The Chiefs would get on the board as kicker Nick Novak nailed a 26-yard field goal, yet Tennessee replied with rookie RB Chris Johnson getting a 66-yard TD run. Kansas City ended the game's scoring with QB Tyler Thigpen getting a 14-yard TD run.

With the win, the Titans stayed perfect at 6–0.

In the game, Tennessee's overall ground game reached a franchise-best 332 yards.

Week 8: vs. Indianapolis Colts 

On Monday Night Football, the Titans responded to the doubters and defeated the Colts for only the fourth time since formation of the AFC South; the final score was 31–21 and came after Indianapolis had been heavily favored to win. Rob Bironas got it started with a field goal but then Peyton Manning found Dallas Clark for a touchdown on the next drive. Bironas pulled the Titans to within one with another field goal, but missed one before the half to keep the Titans behind going into halftime. Manning found Clark once again the 3rd quarter for a 14–6 lead but that would be the last time they would lead as LenDale White scored and Ahmard Hall caught a two-point conversion from Kerry Collins. Bironas hit another field goal to give the Titans the lead for good. Two key interceptions by the Titans put the Colts away as White scored again and rookie Chris Johnson added his fourth rushing touchdown late. Manning would score a rushing touchdown in the final minute but it was too little too late. With the win, the Titans picked up their first 7–0 start in the franchise's entire history, including as the “Oilers”.

During halftime, former Titans Steve McNair, Eddie George, and Frank Wycheck were honored.

Week 9: vs. Green Bay Packers

The Titans kept their record perfect by edging the Packers 19–16 in OT.

Rob Bironas and Mason Crosby each traded field goals early in the first half and the Titans had a 6–3 edge until Aaron Rodgers hooked up with Donald Driver for a touchdown. Then LenDale White helped drive the ball downfield with 50-yard run that set up Chris Johnson's TD run to make it 13–10.

In the second half, the Packers were able to tie the game with two more Crosby field goals and force it into overtime when Bironas missed a potential game-winning field goal at the end of regulation.

In overtime, Kerry Collins and Johnson helped move the ball down the field for a game-winning 47-yard field goal by Bironas, who made up for his mistake at the end of the 4th.

With the win, the Titans ran their regular season winning streak to 11 games, continued their hottest start in franchise history, and remained the only unbeaten team in the league as they improved to 8–0.

Week 10: at Chicago Bears

Coming off their home win over the Packers, the Titans flew to Soldier Field for a Week 10 interconference duel with the Chicago Bears.

In the first quarter, Tennessee trailed early as Bears QB Rex Grossman completed a 5-yard touchdown pass to RB Matt Forte. In the second quarter, the Titans answered with QB Kerry Collins completing a 10-yard TD pass to TE Bo Scaife.

In the third quarter, Tennessee took the lead as Collins completed a 12-yard TD pass to WR Justin Gage (a former Bear). In the fourth quarter, the Titans increased their lead as RB LenDale White got a 2-yard touchdown run. Chicago tried to rally as Grossman got a 1-yard touchdown run, yet Tennessee's defense stiffened for the win.

With the win, the Titans kept their perfect season alive at 9–0.

Week 11: at Jacksonville Jaguars

Coming off two wins in a row over NFC North Division teams, the Titans continued their road tour to Florida for a Week 11 AFC South rematch with the Jacksonville Jaguars. In the first quarter, Tennessee drew first blood as kicker Rob Bironas nailed a 32-yard field goal. In the second quarter, the Jaguars took the lead as RB Maurice Jones-Drew got a 2-yard and a 1-yard TD run. In the third quarter, the Titans regained the lead as QB Kerry Collins completed a 13-yard TD pass to WR Brandon Jones and a 56-yard TD pass to WR Justin Gage. In the fourth quarter, Tennessee closed out the game as Collins hooked up with Gage again on a 38-yard TD pass.

With the win, the Titans kept their dream season alive, improving to a perfect record of 10–0, sweeping the Jaguars for the first time since 2003.

Week 12: vs. New York Jets

Coming off their season-sweeping road win over the Jaguars, the Titans went home for a Week 12 duel with the New York Jets. In the first quarter, Tennessee trailed early as Jets QB Brett Favre completed a 10-yard TD pass to RB Thomas Jones. In the second quarter, New York increased its lead with kicker Jay Feely getting a 20-yard field goal. The Titans closed out the half with kicker Rob Bironas getting a 43-yard field goal.

In the third quarter, the Jets responded as Feely kicked a 30-yard field goal, while Favre completed a 2-yard TD pass to WR Laveranues Coles. In the fourth quarter, Tennessee tried to rally as Rob Bironas nailed a 49-yard field goal, but New York replied with RB Leon Washington getting a 61-yard TD run. The Titans had one last attempt to keep their perfect season alive as QB Kerry Collins completed a 6-yard TD pass to FB Ahmard Hall. However, Tennessee's perfect season went down the tubes as Washington helped seal things for the Jets on a 4-yard TD run.

With the loss, the Titans fell to 10–1.

Week 13: at Detroit Lions

Hoping to rebound from their first loss of the season, the Titans flew to Ford Field for a Week 13 Thanksgiving game against the winless Detroit Lions. In the first quarter, Tennessee drew first blood as rookie RB Chris Johnson got a 6-yard TD run. The Lions would respond with kicker Jason Hanson getting a 53-yard field goal. The Titans would answer with Johnson getting a 58-yard TD run, along with DE Dave Ball returning an interception 15 yards for a touchdown. In the second quarter, Tennessee increased their lead with RB LenDale White getting a 6-yard and a 2-yard TD run. Detroit would reply with QB Daunte Culpepper completing a 2-yard TD pass to TE Michael Gaines.

In the third quarter, kicker Rob Bironas would kick field goals of 41 and 49 yards to put the Titans up by 31, and in the fourth quarter, he would nail field goals of 45 and 43 yards to put the Titans up for good.

With the win, Tennessee not only improved to 11–1 on the season, but the Titans became the only AFC South team to defeat all four NFC North teams in interconference play.

Center Kevin Mawae, DT Albert Haynesworth, and running backs Johnson and White were given CBS's All-Iron Award for their performance.

Week 14: vs. Cleveland Browns

Coming off their Thanksgiving win over the Lions, the Titans came home to face the Cleveland Browns in a Week 14 duel. In the first quarter, Cleveland would jump on top early as Phil Dawson made 47 and 41-yard field goals. Tennessee, however, would answer with a 28-yard pass from Kerry Collins to Ahmard Hall. Then, later in the 2nd quarter, LenDale White found the end zone from 3 yards out to give them a 14–6 lead.

In the third quarter, Kerry Collins found Justin Gage for a 9-yard touchdown and the Titans found themselves in control, leading 21–9 heading into the 4th quarter. Cleveland attempted to make a comeback with Phil Dawson making a 39-yard field goal, but could not finish as Chris Johnson scored from 25 yards out and put the game away for the Titans.

With the win, not only did Tennessee improve to 12–1, but they also clinched their first AFC South title since 2002.

Week 15: at Houston Texans

With the loss, the Titans fell to 12–2 and their winning streak against the Texans came to an end.

Week 16: vs. Pittsburgh Steelers

Hoping to rebound from their divisional road loss to the Texans, the Titans went home for a crucial Week 16 battle with the Pittsburgh Steelers, with the AFC's top seed on the line.

After a scoreless first quarter, the Titans got the second quarter lead as kicker Rob Bironas got a 42-yard field goal, along with quarterback Kerry Collins completing a 34-yard touchdown pass to wide receiver Justin Gage. The Steelers would respond with quarterback Ben Roethlisberger completing a 31-yard touchdown pass to wide receiver Santonio Holmes. In the third quarter, Pittsburgh took the lead as Roethlisberger completed a 21-yard touchdown pass to wide receiver Hines Ward, yet Tennessee struck back with rookie running back Chris Johnson getting a 21-yard touchdown run. The Titans would then pull away in the fourth quarter with running back LenDale White's 1-yard touchdown run and safety Michael Griffin's 83-yard interception return for a touchdown. This was the first game of the year where the league-leading Steelers defense allowed more than 300 yards of total offense (allowing 332 yards).

With the win, not only did Tennessee improve to 13–2, but also locked up the AFC's #1 seed. This would prove the Titans last win until Week 8 of the 2009 season.

This would also be the last time a team swept both the AFC North and NFC North in the same season until the Dallas Cowboys did so in 2016.

Week 17: at Indianapolis Colts

With the AFC's #1 seed under their belt, the Titans flew to Lucas Oil Stadium to close out their regular season in a Week 17 AFC South rematch with the Indianapolis Colts. The Titans rested several of their starters for the game including Chris Johnson and benched Kerry Collins early. Tennessee trailed early in the first quarter as Colts quarterback Peyton Manning completed a 55-yard touchdown pass to running back Joseph Addai followed by kicker Adam Vinatieri's 28-yard field goal. The Titans' deficit would increase in the second quarter as Vinatieri nailed a 21-yard and a 38-yard field goal. After a scoreless third quarter, Indianapolis closed out the game in the fourth quarter as center Jamey Richard recovered a fumble within Tennessee's endzone for a touchdown.

With the loss, the Titans ended the regular season at 13–3. This would become the beginning of an eight-game losing streak for the Titans.

Playoffs

AFC Divisional Round: vs. Baltimore Ravens

Entering the postseason as the AFC's top seed, the Titans began their postseason run at home in the AFC Divisional round against the #6 Baltimore Ravens, in a rematch of their Week 5 contest.

Matt Stover kicked a 43-yard field goal with 57 seconds remaining to send the Ravens into the AFC Championship Game at the expense of the Titans, as quarterback Joe Flacco became the first rookie quarterback to win two playoff games in a single postseason. Tennessee turned the ball over three times, which proved to be the difference between the two teams, as Baltimore never gave the ball away.

The Titans took the lead on their second drive of the game with Kerry Collins completing a 28-yard pass to rookie running back Chris Johnson and a 20-yarder to Justin Gage before Johnson finished the drive with an 8-yard touchdown run. But the Ravens answered back with a 48-yard touchdown Flacco pass to former Titan Derrick Mason.

Early in the second quarter, Tennessee drove to the Ravens 25-yard line, only to turn the ball over on downs due to a fumbled snap on a fourth down conversion attempt. Then after forcing a punt, their drive to the Ravens 32-yard line also ended with no points when a pass from Collins was picked off by former Titan Samari Rolle. Following another punt, the Titans moved the ball into scoring range for the third time in a row, this time driving to the Baltimore 22. But once again they came up empty after LenDale White's fumble was recovered by Ravens safety Jim Leonhard with 25 seconds left in the half.

In the second half, a 29-yard punt return by Leonard and a 37-yard reception by Mark Clayton set up a Stover field goal to take a 10–7 lead. Meanwhile, the Titans failed to score again, as Rob Bironas missed a 51-yard field goal and after Stover's field goal, and Ravens cornerback Fabian Washington forced and recovered a fumble from tight end Alge Crumpler on Baltimore's 1-yard line.

However, the Ravens were unable to gain any yards with their ensuing drive and Tennessee got the ball back with great field position at the Ravens 42-yard line. This time, they managed to drive to the 10-yard line and score with a Bironas field goal to tie the game at 10.

Two plays after the ensuing kickoff, Baltimore faced 3rd down and 2. On the next play, the play clock appeared to expire before the snap, but no penalty flag was thrown and Flacco ended up completing a 23-yard pass to Todd Heap. Five plays later, Stover's 43-yard field goal gave the Ravens a 13–10 lead with 53 seconds left. Baltimore's defense then sealed the victory by forcing Tennessee to turn the ball over on downs on their own 40-yard line.

Notes

References

External links

Tennessee
Tennessee Titans seasons
AFC South championship seasons
Titans